Cade is an unincorporated community in Bryan County, Oklahoma, United States. It is in northeastern Bryan County and had a post office from April 1, 1903 until October 31, 1915. Cade was named after Cassius M. Cade, a territorial political leader.  At the time of its founding Cade was located in Jackson County, Choctaw Nation.

References

Unincorporated communities in Bryan County, Oklahoma
Unincorporated communities in Oklahoma